The 2008 Saint Francis Red Flash football team represented Saint Francis University as a member of the Northeast Conference (NEC) during the 2008 NCAA Division I FCS football season. The Red Flash were led by seventh-year head coach Dave Opfar and played their home games at DeGol Field. They finished the season 0–11 overall and 0–7 in NEC play to place last.

Schedule

References

Saint Francis
Saint Francis Red Flash football seasons
College football winless seasons
Saint Francis Red Flash football